Enno Edzardisna (also known as Enno Cirksena, Enno Attena and rarely Enno Syardsna;  – ) was a chieftain of Norden, Greetsiel, Berum and Pilsum in East Frisia.  He was the son of the chieftain Edzard II of Appingen-Greetsiel and his wife Doda tom Brok.  Enno was a pioneer of the claim of the house Cirksena to the rule over all of East Frisia, which his son finally Ulrich I formally achieved when he was made an Imperial Count in 1464.

Enno's first wife is not documented. He married his second wife Gela Syardsna of Manslagt (d. 1455), a daughter of the chieftain Affo Beninga of Pilsum.  After Gela's only son from her first marriage, the chief Liudward Cirksena ("Syrtza") of Berum had died without an heir in the middle 1430s, Gela and her niece Frauwa Cirksena ("Sirtzena") were the only heirs of the Cirksena family in Berum.  Enno seized the opportunity.  His son Edzard from his first marriage, married Frauwa Cirksena and Enno and Edzard adopted the Cirksena family name and coat of arms, to emphasize the succession.

From the first marriage, Enno had one son and one daughter:
 Edzard (died in 1441 of the plague)
 married firstly Moeder Ennosna (d. 1438)
 married secondly Frauwa Cirksena ("Sirtzena") of Berum
 Doda, (died after 1470)
 married Redward of Westerhusen

From his second marriage, Enno had five children:
 Ulrich I
 married firstly to Foelke of Esens (d. 1452)
 married secondly in 1455 with Theda Ukena, the daughter of Uko Fockena
 Tiadeke (born: 1438, died after 1470)
 Adda (died )
 married to Lütet Manninga of Lütetsburg (d. 1450)
 Frouwa
 first marriage to Sibet of Dornum (d. 1433)
 second marriage to Eppo Gockinga of Zuidbroek (died after 1444)
 Ocka (?)

East Frisian chieftains
14th-century German nobility
15th-century German nobility
House of Cirksena
1380s births
1450s deaths